Mullanpur Garibdass is a town in Mohali district in the Indian state of Punjab, north of the city of Mohali and Chandigarh. Garibdas village is located in vicinity of this town.

History
This town was founded by Garibdass, a commander of king Hathnoria Raja. The full name of the town is "Mullanpur Garibdass Da". Legend has it that Jayanti Devi, the Roop of Durga, asked Garibdass to fight against the cruel King to save civilians. Garibdass won the war and founded Mullanpur as the first village of his empire.

Demographics 
 India census, Mullanpur Garibdass had a population of 6143. Males constitute 53% of the population and females 47%. Mullanpur- Garibdas has an average literacy rate of 72%, higher than the national average of 59.5%: male literacy is 76%, and female literacy is 67%. In Mullanpur- Garibdas, 13% of the population is under 6 years of age. As of 2011 Census of India, 51.27 percent of residents are Sikhs and 46.20% are Hindus. Greater Mohali Area Development Authority has a low-density residential scheme in this town.

Sports 

Maharaja Yadavindra Singh International Cricket Stadium is an international cricket stadium in town. There was also plan of Government of Punjab to develop a golf course on 150 hectare in Mullanpur as well as spa village would also be built apart from a turf club with Indoor and outdoor stadiums which will be built there along with a lifestyle sports hub.

See also
 New Chandigarh
 Mirzapur, Mohali
 Mullanpur International Cricket Stadium

References

Sahibzada Ajit Singh Nagar district